Sir William Henry Wilson-Todd, 1st Baronet (17 April 1828 – 10 April 1910) was a British Conservative Party politician.  He was elected as member of parliament (MP) for the Howdenshire constituency at the 1892 general election, and held the seat until he stepped down from Parliament at the 1906 general election.

He was made a baronet on 31 August 1903, of Halnaby Hall, Yorkshire.

References

External links 
 

1828 births
1910 deaths
Conservative Party (UK) MPs for English constituencies
UK MPs 1892–1895
UK MPs 1895–1900
UK MPs 1900–1906
Baronets in the Baronetage of the United Kingdom